Msinga Local Municipality is an administrative area in the Umzinyathi District of KwaZulu-Natal in South Africa. The name means a current in the sea where air movement causes ripples on top of the water surface and ends up influencing the nearby climatic conditions through its breeze.

Msinga is largely located in deep gorges of the Tugela and Buffalo Rivers, isolated from the immediate surrounding municipal areas. The population dynamics result in a growing rural area and a declining urban area in Msinga, contrary to most other areas in the country. This can be attributed to the fact that the urban areas of Msinga are very small and are unable to provide the normal range of goods and services provided in urban areas.

Msinga is a poverty stricken area with few economic resources and little economic activity. Social services and private households generate 29% of the income for the area.

Main places
The 2001 census divided the municipality into the following main places:

Politics 

The municipal council consists of forty-one members elected by mixed-member proportional representation. Twenty-one councillors are elected by first-past-the-post voting in twenty-one wards, while the remaining twenty are chosen from party lists so that the total number of party representatives is proportional to the number of votes received. In the election of 1 November 2021 the Inkatha Freedom Party (IFP) won a majority of twenty-seven seats on the council.

The following table shows the results of the election.

References

External links
 http://www.msinga.org/

Local municipalities of the Umzinyathi District Municipality